Phosphorus dioxide is a gaseous oxide of phosphorus. It is a free radical that plays a role in the chemiluminescence of phosphorus and phosphine. It is produced when phosphates are heated to high temperatures.

In the ground state the molecule is bent, like nitrogen dioxide, but there is an excited state that is linear.

References

Phosphorus oxides
Free radicals